On the Fire is a 1919 American short comedy film featuring Harold Lloyd.  Some prints have the title of the film as The Chef. Prints of the film survive in several film archives, and it is available on DVD.

Plot
Harold and Snub are chefs in an upscale restaurant.  Harold, an idler, does many of his cooking tasks using pulleys, long-handled implements, and other gadgets so he does not have to leave his chair.  When a customer orders a seafood dinner, and Harold tries to catch fish from the restaurant's fountain for it, he is reassigned from the kitchen to become a waiter.  Trying to favor the female diners at the tables, Harold quickly runs afoul of the customers.

Cast
 Harold Lloyd as The Chef
 Bebe Daniels  
 Snub Pollard as The Assistant Chef
 Bud Jamison
 William Blaisdell
 Sammy Brooks
 Billy Fay
 Lew Harvey
 Wallace Howe
 Margaret Joslin
 Dee Lampton
 Marie Mosquini
 Fred C. Newmeyer
 Dorothea Wolbert
 Noah Young

See also
 Harold Lloyd filmography

References

External links

1919 films
American silent short films
1919 comedy films
1919 short films
American black-and-white films
Films directed by Hal Roach
Silent American comedy films
American comedy short films
Surviving American silent films
1910s American films